"The Moon Is Rising" is a song by Samanta Tīna. The song represented Latvia in the Eurovision Song Contest 2021 in Rotterdam, the Netherlands, after being internally selected by the national broadcaster Latvijas Televīzija (LTV).

The official music video was directed by Samanta Tīna, with producer Aiga Baikova and operator Ritvars Bluka. The video was filmed using a phone camera.

Eurovision Song Contest

Internal selection 
On 16 May 2020, LTV announced Latvian singer Samanta Tīna as the country's representative for the Eurovision Song Contest 2021.

At Eurovision 

The 65th edition of the Eurovision Song Contest took place in Rotterdam, the Netherlands and consisted of two semi-finals on 18 and 20 May 2021, and the grand final on 22 May 2021. On 17 November 2020, it was announced that Latvia would be performing in the second half of the second semi-final of the contest.

Release history

References 

2021 songs
2021 singles
Eurovision songs of 2021
Eurovision songs of Latvia
Samanta Tīna songs
Songs written by Aminata Savadogo